Johan Baumann   (born 8 August 1934) is a Norwegian dogsledder, sports administrator and politician.

He served as president of the Norwegian Ski Federation from 1987 to 1995. He won six national titles in dogsledding and was awarded the King's Cup in 1960. From 1972 to 1978 he chaired the Association for the Promotion of Skiing. Baumann has also represented the Conservative Party in Drammen city council.

References

1934 births
Living people
Norwegian sports executives and administrators
Norwegian dog mushers
Conservative Party (Norway) politicians
Politicians from Drammen